The 1899 Penn Quakers football team represented the University of Pennsylvania in the 1899 college football season.

Schedule

References

Penn
Penn Quakers football seasons
College football undefeated seasons
Penn Quakers football